Raheem Somersall (born 5 July 1997) is a Kittitian professional footballer who plays for North Carolina FC in USL League One and the Saint Kitts and Nevis national team.

Somersall played collegiately at Appalachian State University and at Florida Gulf Coast University.

Somersall joined North Carolina FC on December 2, 2021.

International career
At the youth level he played in the 2017 CONCACAF U-20 Championship and 2020 CONCACAF Men's Olympic Qualifying Championship qualification.

Career statistics

Club

Notes

International

References

External links
 Raheem Somersall at Caribbean Football Database
 Raheem Somersall profile at the Appalachian State University

1997 births
Living people
Appalachian State Mountaineers men's soccer players
Association football midfielders
Expatriate soccer players in the United States
FC Tucson players
Florida Gulf Coast Eagles men's soccer players
IMG Academy Bradenton players
Ocean City Nor'easters players
People from Basseterre
Saint Kitts and Nevis expatriate footballers
Saint Kitts and Nevis expatriate sportspeople in the United States
Saint Kitts and Nevis footballers
Saint Kitts and Nevis international footballers
Saint Kitts and Nevis youth international footballers
Tormenta FC players
North Carolina FC players
USL League Two players
USL League One players